WFEN (88.3 FM) is a radio station licensed to Rockford, Illinois, United States, the station serves the Rockford/Madison area. WFEN features contemporary Christian music and Christian talk and teaching. Other weekly programming includes Gospel Country with John Tallecksen, The Gospel Greats with Rodney Baucom, "20" The countdown magazine with William Ryan III and local public service program "Matters with Matt". WFEN also broadcasts teaching programs from Bob Yandian, Joyce Meyer, Apostle Don Lyon and others. The station is owned and locally programmed by Faith Academy in Rockford.

References

External links

FEN
1992 establishments in Illinois
Radio stations established in 1992
Rockford, Illinois